"1, 2, 3 Dayz Up" (stylized as "1,2,3 dayz up") is a song by German singer-songwriter Kim Petras featuring Scottish producer Sophie. It is the final of eleven singles that form Petras' unofficial project Era 1.

The song was produced by Sophie, Dr. Luke and Aaron Joseph, and was written by them along with Petras and Aaron Jennings. The track's official lyric video was released on 13 February 2019.

Background
Prior to the release, Sophie premiered the song as "We Don't Stop" at Form 2018. The track was officially released on February 8 alongside the songs "If U Think About Me..." and "Homework" featuring Lil Aaron.

The song was composed in the D-flat major key at 108 beats-per-minute and is 3 minutes and 33 seconds long. The track was Petras' first release since her Halloween-themed EP Turn Off The Light, Vol. 1 (2018).

Reception
Chloe Gilke of Uproxx was positive in their review of the song and cited as "one of Petras' best releases to date" further dubbing it as "a party anthem that clicks and pops with producer Sophie's electro-pop magic." A writer for DIY proclaimed the song as "an addictive pop banger made all the better by Sophie's slick production". Salvatore Maicki of The Fader was also positive in their review, calling the song "straight up beach party music". Robin Murray of Clash Music called the song "upremely addictive" and further added that track is "superbly feminine while linked utterly to digital developments, it manages to be both an outrageous pop statement and a real 'wtf?' moment." Justin Horowitz of All Things Go praised the pairing for being "celebrated faces of women in the trans community and have used their talents to spread awareness and equality regarding LGBTQA+ rights."

The music blog Bit Of Pop Music gave a mixed review, saying that the song might be a bit basic and repetitive in terms of vocals and lyrics" but stated that "the production is impeccable". The Bozo gave the song a lukewarm review but compared it to the sounds of Charli XCX and praised it as their favorite out of the three songs released together.

Billboard ranked the song as the fifth best Era 1 single, noting that "the track has all the makings of a pop hit straight out of 2010, but its bubbly, tropical touches update the sound for the modern era".

Commercial performance
The song debuted and peaked at number 40 on the Billboard Dance/Electronic Songs chart.

Charts

References

2019 singles
2019 songs
Kim Petras songs
Sophie (musician) songs
Song recordings produced by Dr. Luke
Song recordings produced by Sophie (musician)
Songs written by Dr. Luke
Songs written by Kim Petras
Songs written by Sophie (musician)